Callidrepana heinzhuebneri is a moth in the family Drepanidae. It was first described by Ulf Buchsbaum, Frank Brüggemeier and Mei-Yu Chen in 2014. It is found in Laos.

The wingspan is 20–22 mm for males and 25–27 mm for females. The ground colour is greyish yellow, the forewings with a dark brown line at the costa and termen and a dark brown discal mark. The submarginal line is brown, with a silver shining tinge. There is a brown silver shining line along the costa. The hindwings have brown markings and silver shining postdiscal fascia from the outer margin to the centre.

References

Moths described in 2014
Drepaninae